Eremita is the fourth studio solo album by former Emperor frontman Ihsahn.  The album features guest appearances by several notable musicians, including Devin Townsend and Jeff Loomis of Nevermore.

Background
The album is Ihsahn's first solo outing since the conclusion of the conceptual trilogy encompassing his first three albums, The Adversary, angL, and After.  Ihsahn said that Eremita was the product of an intentional contrast with After. He described After as "a very desolate, bleak landscape. There were no signs of life in any of the lyrics," while, for Eremita, the atmosphere is "much more introverted, much more paranoid and kind of schizophrenic. I tend to bring up many of the same themes, but lyrically it comes from a different perspective."

The album's sense of introversion, paranoia, and schizophrenia is represented in the album cover, with which Ihsahn's ongoing interest in Nietzsche turned to Nietzsche's mad final years.  Nietzsche is represented in the cover, which features an upside-down image of his  face from later in his life, when he was on the verge of insanity.  As Ihsahn explained, Eremita is "a reflective album that’s filtered through the eyes of a madman."  He elaborated upon the connection, explaining that "There's an escapism to this album, there's a paranoia, a lot of issues that are dealt with, and these pictures of Nietzsche are from very close to when he tipped over into madness."

Guest appearances
Eremita featured a guest appearance by Devin Townsend.  Previously, Ihsahn had guested on Townsend's album, Deconstruction.  Jens Bogren, who mixed Deconstruction, was also tapped to mix Eremita.  Ihsahn noted that

Concept
The title is Latin for "hermit", which Ihsahn identified as a critical term in his intellectual and musical development:

Continuing, Ihsahn elaborated on his connection to mythological hermits as follows:

Track listing

Personnel

Band
 Ihsahn – vocals, guitar, bass, keyboard
 Tobias Ørnes Andersen – drums
 Jørgen Munkeby – saxophone

Guest musicians
 Jeff Loomis – solo guitar on "The Eagle and the Snake"
 Devin Townsend – vocals on "Introspection"
 Einar Solberg (Leprous) – vocals on "Arrival"
 Heidi S. Tveitan – vocals on "Departure"

Production
 Ihsahn – production
 Jens Bogren – mixing at Fascination Street Studios in Örebro, Sweden
 Ritxi Ostáriz – album artwork and packaging

References

2012 albums
Ihsahn albums